Wrecks To Riches was an American reality television show shown on Discovery channel. Season one premiered on March 28, 2006. The second and final season ended on June 14, 2007. The show focused on Barry White and his staff buying old cars for little money and turning them into Super Muscle cars. There was usually a deadline of between three and four weeks to complete the cars after which they were auctioned off at various locations around the United States. One of the completed cars has even been auctioned on eBay.

Episode list - Season 1

Episode list - Season 2

References

Wrecks to Riches Home Page

2006 American television series debuts
2007 American television series endings
2000s American reality television series
Vehicle modification media
Discovery Channel original programming
Automotive television series
Television series by Beyond Television Productions